The 2018–19 Texas Tech Lady Raiders basketball team represents Texas Tech University in the 2018–19 NCAA Division I women's basketball season. The Lady Raiders are led by first year head coach Marlene Stollings. They play their homes games at United Supermarkets Arena and are members of the Big 12 Conference. They finished the season 14–17, 4–14 in Big 12 play to finish in a tied for eighth place. They advanced to the quarterfinals  of the Big 12 women's tournament where they lost to Baylor.

Media

Television & Radio information
Select Lady Raiders games will be shown on FSN affiliates throughout the season, including FSSW, FSSW+, and FCS Atlantic, Central, and Pacific. All games will be broadcast on the Lady Raiders Radio Network on either KLZK or KJTV.

Roster

Schedule

|-
!colspan=12 style=| Non-conference regular season

|-
!colspan=12 style=| Big 12 regular season

|-
!colspan=12 style=| Big 12 Women's Tournament

See also
2018–19 Texas Tech Red Raiders basketball team

References

Texas Tech Lady Raiders basketball seasons
Texas Tech